NGC 3766 (also known as Caldwell 97or the Pearl Cluster) is an open star cluster in the southern constellation Centaurus. It is located in the vast star-forming region known as the Carina molecular cloud, and was discovered by Nicolas Louis de Lacaille during his astrometric survey in 1751–1752. At a distance of about 1745 pc, the cluster subtends a diameter of about 12 minutes of arc.

There are 137 listed stars, but many are likely non-members, with only 36 having accurate photometric data. It has a total apparent magnitude of 5.3 and integrated spectral type of B1.7. NGC 3766 is relatively young, with an estimated age of log (7.160) or 14.4 million years, and is approaching us at 14.8 km/s. This cluster contains eleven Be stars, two red supergiants and four Ap stars.

36 examples of an unusual type of variable star were discovered in the cluster. These fast-rotating pulsating B-type stars vary by only a few hundredths of a magnitude with periods less than half a day. They are main sequence stars, hotter than δ Scuti variables and cooler than slowly pulsating B stars.

See also
 New General Catalogue

References

External links
 
 NGC 3766 at SEDS
 Astrophotograph Link
 WEBDA Data on NGC 3766 by Lynga
 

Open clusters
3766
Centaurus (constellation)
097b